Alexandru Pînzari (born 3 January 1973) is a Moldovan policeman and politician. He served as Minister of Defense of Moldova from March-November 2020. Prior to his appointment, he served as the head of the General Police Inspectorate for four years. His career began as an inspector for the Judicial Police of the Buiucani Police Inspectorate in 1998. He speaks English and Russian as well as Romanian. He is a graduate of the Odessa Maritime College in Ukraine (1988-1992) and the Ştefan cel Mare Police Academy (1992-1997).

References

1973 births
Living people
People from Căușeni District
Moldovan Ministers of Defense